is a studio album by the Irish pop group The Nolans. Released on 21 May 1992 exclusively in Japan by Teichiku Records, the album consists of five original songs and five English-language covers of Princess Princess songs.

Track listing 

 Tracks 2–6 originally recorded by Princess Princess.

References

External links
 

1992 albums
The Nolans albums
Covers albums
Teichiku Records albums